State Farm Fire & Casualty Co. v. United States ex rel. Rigsby, 580 U.S. ___ (2016), was a case in which the Supreme Court of the United States clarified the consequences of violating the False Claims Act's requirement that cases be kept under seal. In a unanimous opinion written by Justice Anthony Kennedy, the Court held that a violation of the False Claim Act's seal requirement does not require the dismissal of a complaint.

Background
State Farm Fire and Casualty Company is an insurance company. Prior to 2005, State Farm offered two types of insurance policies to homeowners: flood insurance, which would be reimbursed by the federal government's National Flood Insurance Program, and general homeowner insurance, which would be paid directly by State Farm. After Hurricane Katrina, a State Farm contractor instructed its insurance adjusters to falsely classify wind damage as flood damage so that the federal government, rather than State Farm, would assume liability for the insurance. In 2006, two of these former State Farm claims adjusters, the Rigsby sisters, filed a qui tam suit against State Farm under the False Claims Act. The Act required that the complaint against State Farm be kept secret (under seal) for at least 60 days. While the case was still under seal, the adjusters' attorney disclosed the existence of the complaint to journalists at ABC, the Associated Press, and The New York Times. State Farm then filed a motion to dismiss based on the theory that the adjusters violated the False Claims Act's seal requirement, but the District Court denied the motion and the adjusters ultimately won at trial. State Farm filed an appeal in the United States Court of Appeals for the Fifth Circuit, but the Fifth Circuit affirmed the District Court's ruling on the seal violations. State Farm filed another appeal to the Supreme Court of the United States, which granted certiorari in 2016.

Opinion of the Court
In a unanimous opinion written by Justice Anthony Kennedy, the Supreme Court affirmed the Fifth Circuit's ruling and held that a violation of the False Claim Act's seal requirement does not require dismissal of a complaint. Justice Kennedy explained that the False Claims Act did not specify a remedy for violations of the seal requirement, but that the structure of the act indicates that dismissal is not required when parties violate the seal requirement. He stated that "had Congress intended to require dismissal for a violation of the seal requirement, it would have said so." Furthermore, Justice Kennedy stated that monetary penalties or other forms of attorney discipline were still available to sanction and deter future seal violations.

Commentary and analysis
Writing for The National Law Review, Evan Panich noted that "the Court made no definitive ruling" about the kinds of sanctions that would be sufficient to deter future violations of the Act's seal requirement. In his analysis of the case for SCOTUSblog, Ronald Mann commented that "the dominant feature of the court’s quick, unanimous resolution of the case is an overt avoidance of any specific articulation of standards for use by the lower courts." National Public Radio correspondent Nina Totenberg wrote that this case was the "first of many" lawsuits alleging that State Farm "evaded its responsibility by manipulating the reports of its own adjusters and engineers."

See also
 List of United States Supreme Court cases
 Lists of United States Supreme Court cases by volume
 List of United States Supreme Court cases by the Roberts Court

Notes

References

External links
 

2016 in United States case law
Hurricane Katrina
United States Supreme Court cases
United States Supreme Court cases of the Roberts Court
State Farm
Fraud in the United States
Flood insurance